Kevin Burke was the Chairman, President, and CEO of Consolidated Edison. He joined Consolidated Edison in 1973. He was promoted to Chief Operating Officer in 2000, President and CEO in 2005, and Chairman in 2006, serving until his retirement in 2013. He is a board member of Honeywell since 2010 and a trustee of Alfred P. Sloan Foundation.

Educational background 
Burke graduated from Manhattan's prestigious Regis High School in 1968. He holds a bachelor's degree in engineering from The Cooper Union, a master's degree in engineering from Rensselaer Polytechnic Institute, a master of business administration from Columbia University, and a juris doctor from Fordham University.

He resides in Ponte Vedra Beach, Florida.

References 

Columbia Business School alumni
Living people
Rensselaer Polytechnic Institute alumni
American chief executives of energy companies
American chief operating officers
Cooper Union alumni
Fordham University School of Law alumni
Regis High School (New York City) alumni
Year of birth missing (living people)